RSS Tenacious (71) is the fourth ship of the Formidable-class stealth frigate of the Republic of Singapore Navy.

Construction and career 
RSS Tenacious was built by ST Marine Engineering company in Singapore around the late in the 2000s. Tenacious was commissioned on 5 February 2008.

RIMPAC 2018 
RSS Tenacious arrived at Pearl Harbor on 25 June 2018 for RIMPAC 2018, which took place from 27 June to 2 August 2018. During the RIMPAC exercise, RSS Tenacious successfully test fired her Harpoon missiles.

Exercise PELICAN 2019 
The Republic of Singapore Navy and the Royal Brunei Navy held an exercise which consists of RSS Tenacious, RSS Valour, RSS Vigour, KDB Darussalam, KDB Darulehsan and KDB Darulaman. All Republic of Singapore Navy ships left on 7 November 2019.

SIMTEX 2019 
Singapore, India and Thailand held a Naval exercise called SIMTEX on 11 October 2019. RSS Tenacious, HTMS Kraburi, INS Ranvir, INS Kora and INS Sukanya participated in the exercise.

Exercise Indopura 2021 
RSS Tenacious participated in Exercise Indopura 2021, together with the Indonesian Navy.

Exercise Pacific Griffin 2021 
RSS Tenacious led 3 other ships, RSS Stalwart, RSS Fearless, MV Avatar to participate in Exercise Pacific Griffin 2021, together with the United States Navy. The two month long exercise involved numerous assets including 2 F15SG fighter jets to conduct a joint missile firing together with her sister ship RSS Stalwart. In addition, the participating ships conducted Aster missile firing and torpedo firing exercises.

Exercise MILAN 2022 
RSS Tenacious participated in Exercise MILAN, a multinational exercise involving more than 30 nations organized by the Royal Australian Navy. During the sea phase, RSS Tenacious participated in air defence, gunnery and anti-submarine warfare drills together with the multinational task force.

Gallery

References 

Ships of the Republic of Singapore Navy
2005 ships
Formidable-class frigates
Republic of Singapore Navy